The Our Lady of the Rosary Cathedral , also called Corrientes Cathedral, is a Roman Catholic church located in the city of Corrientes. Argentina The cathedral is within the Archdiocese of Corrientes. It is located at Hipólito Yrigoyen street 1542, compared to the Sargento Cabral square. It was built in the period between 1854 and 1861, until the building was officially enabled in 1872 with the transfer of the images of the old Mother Church.

It was listed as a Provincial Historic Monument by the 2002 Act in 1959.

See also
Roman Catholicism in Argentina
List of cathedrals in Argentina
Our Lady of the Rosary

References

Roman Catholic cathedrals in Argentina
Buildings and structures in Corrientes
Roman Catholic churches completed in 1861
19th-century Roman Catholic church buildings in Argentina